Lawrence Douglas Versett, (c. 1891 – July 3, 1963) was a pioneering Albertan homesteader, amateur pilot, and master tool-builder. He is the namesake of the Douglas mountain range in Alberta’s Rocky Mountains. Versett and his family were honored in the book Fatal Passage: The Untold Story of John Rae, the Arctic Adventurer Who Discovered the Fate of Franklin (2002).

Biography

Early life
Versett was born around 1891 in the mountains of Alberta. After a few years he moved with his parents to India where he spent three years in the foothills of the Himalayas, until the age of eight, coming to love the mountains and exploration At age 16, he found work in Alberta on an Eversett Intercontinental railroad construction crew.

Farm and Family
Versett chose a location for the farm forty-miles walk from the nearest human settlement, deep in the mountains over a treacherous trail on the far end of Pixel Lake (which Versett named), in what is today Tweedsmuir South Provincial Park. Winters were long, snowy and very cold. He spent the first decade alone, clearing towering virgin forests of cedar trees with hand tools, building a multistory log home, shooting and trapping game. He rarely left the farm, and could only bring in from the outside what he could carry on his back and packhorse over a difficult mountainous trail, which took at least two days to traverse. Versett named the farm "The Mercer".

Final years and postscript
Versett sold The Mercer to French settlers. He then took up commercial ocean fishing in his 70s, and for the remainder of his days lived in Calgary. He died in 1963 of an unexplained virus, leaving behind two children and a wife.

References

20th-century Canadian people
Expatriates of Canada in British India
1890s births
1963 deaths